Vanesa Gimbert Acosta (born 19 April 1980) is a Spanish retired football who played as a defender or midfielder. She played for clubs including Levante, Sevilla, Rayo Vallecano, Espanyol and Athletic Bilbao in Spain's Primera División, retiring in 2022 aged 42.

Career
Born in the Basque Country and raised partly in Andalusia, she previously played for RCD Espanyol, Levante UD, CFF Estudiantes, Sevilla and Rayo Vallecano. She won four league titles with Levante and Rayo (coming close to another with Sevilla) and five Copas de la Reina between her spells at those two clubs and Espanyol.

In 2016, 36-year-old Gimbert won the league title with Athletic, then agreed to remain with the club for another year. Five years later (now aged 41, the oldest active player in the country) she was still playing regularly, including scoring both goals in a victory over Santa Teresa and agreed a further one-year contract in the summer of 2021. She retired one year later after nine years in Bilbao alongside teammate Erika Vázquez, who by coincidence was one of the opponents 22 years earlier when Gimbert won the first trophy of her career, the 2000 Copa de la Reina de Fútbol when Levante defeated Lagunak. Her statistics with Athletic included being its oldest debutant (aged 33), longest run of consecutive matches (86, completing the 90 minutes every time) and oldest player (aged 42).

Gimbert was a member of the Spain women's national football team from a young age, taking part at 17 in the 1997 European Championship. She was the team's captain in the 2009 European Championship qualifying.

International goals
1999 FIFA Women's World Cup play-off
 1 in Spain 4–1 Scotland (1998)
 2001 Euro qualification
 1 in Netherlands 1–2 Spain (2000)
 1 in Spain 1–6 Denmark (2000)
 2003 FIFA Women's World Cup qualification
 1 in Spain 6–1 Iceland (2001)
 2007 FIFA Women's World Cup qualification
 1 in Spain 3–2 Belgium (2005)
 2009 Euro qualification
 1 in Spain 4–1 Czech Republic (2008)

Honours

Club
 Levante
 Primera División: 2000–01, 2001–02
 Copa de la Reina: 2000, 2001, 2002

 Rayo Vallecano
 Primera División: 2008–09, 2009–10
 Copa de la Reina: 2008

 Espanyol
 Copa de la Reina: 2012

 Athletic Bilbao
 Primera División: 2015–16
 Copa de la Reina: runner-up 2014

References

External links

Profile at aupaAthletic.com 
Profile at La Liga 

1980 births
Living people
Spanish women's footballers
Spain women's international footballers
Primera División (women) players
Levante UD Femenino players
Athletic Club Femenino players
Rayo Vallecano Femenino players
RCD Espanyol Femenino players
Footballers from the Basque Country (autonomous community)
People from Bergara
Athletic Bilbao non-playing staff
Women's association football midfielders
Sportspeople from Gipuzkoa
21st-century Spanish women